Mubarikpur is a village in the Bhopal district of Madhya Pradesh, India. It is located in the Huzur tehsil and the Phanda block. Hindi is the local language.

Demographics 

According to the 2011 census of India, Mubarikpur has 248 households. The effective literacy rate (i.e. the literacy rate of population excluding children aged 6 and below) is 69.43%.

References 

Villages in Huzur tehsil